Jermaine Robert Asare (born 22 September 1983) is a Welsh professional boxer. He represented Great Britain at the 2010 Commonwealth Games in Delhi, winning a bronze medal. He turned professional in 2013 and unsuccessfully challenged for the Welsh light-heavyweight title in 2017, suffering a defeat to Nathan Thorley.

Early life
Born in Cardiff, Asare played  football as a teenager and was part of the youth academies at both Cardiff City and Swansea City.

Career

Asare, who hails from the Graigwen area of  Pontypridd, took up boxing as a teenager and joined Pontypridd Amateur Boxing Club. He later fought for Merthyr Ex-servicemen's Club and recorded an amateur record of 19–6. Asare win the Welsh light-heavyweight amateur title in 2010 and was selected to represent Great Britain at the 2010 Commonwealth Games in Delhi. He won a bronze medal in the light heavyweight division. Asare secured the medal with a win over Samoa's Filimaua Hala.

Asare turned professional in 2013, winning his debut bout over Danny Mitchell via a points decision. He won two further bouts before suffering his first defeat to Eric Mokonzo in March 2016. He suffered a second defeat to Malik Zinad in 2017 before fighting Nathan Thorley for the vacant Welsh light-heavyweight title later the se year. Thorley won the bout when the referee stopped the fight in the second round after Asare had been knocked down.

Personal life
Asare is also a self-employed electrician.
In 2011 he received a 12-month prison sentence for affray and breaching a restraining order when he broke into his ex-partner's home.

References

External links

1983 births
Living people
Welsh male boxers
Commonwealth Games bronze medallists for Wales
Commonwealth Games medallists in boxing
Boxers at the 2010 Commonwealth Games
Sportspeople from Pontypridd
Light-heavyweight boxers
Medallists at the 2010 Commonwealth Games